Macropodus is a genus of small to medium-sized labyrinth fish native to freshwater habitats in eastern Asia. Most species are restricted to southern China (including Hong Kong and Taiwan) and Vietnam, but M. opercularis occurs as far north as the Yangtze basin, and M. ocellatus occurs north to the Amur River, as well as in Japan and Korea. In China, they are often used for fights, so they are named Chinese bettas because of their similarity to the genus Betta. A few species in the genus are regularly seen in the aquarium trade, and M. opercularis has been introduced to regions far outside its native range.

Species
As of 2014, the recognized species in this genus are:
 Macropodus baviensis H. D. Nguyễn & V. H. Nguyễn, 2005
 Macropodus erythropterus Freyhof & Herder, 2002 (Red-backed paradisefish)
 Macropodus hongkongensis Freyhof & Herder, 2002
 Macropodus lineatus V. H. Nguyễn, S. V. Ngô & H. D. Nguyễn, 2005
 Macropodus ocellatus Cantor, 1842 (Round-tailed paradisefish)
 Macropodus oligolepis V. H. Nguyễn, S. V. Ngô & H. D. Nguyễn, 2005 
 Macropodus opercularis (Linnaeus, 1758) (Paradise fish)
 Macropodus phongnhaensis S. V. Ngô, V. H. Nguyễn & H. D. Nguyễn, 2005
 Macropodus spechti Schreitmüller, 1936 (Black paradisefish)

References

 
Macropodusinae
 
Freshwater fish genera
Taxa named by Bernard Germain de Lacépède